Huehuetenango Airport  is an airport serving the city of Huehuetenango, the capital of Huehuetenango Department, Guatemala.

The airport is in the southwestern section of the city, which is in a high elevation basin.

The Huehuetenango non-directional beacon (Ident: HUE) is located on the field.

Airlines and destinations

See also
 
 
 Transport in Guatemala
 List of airports in Guatemala

References

External links
 OurAirports - Huehuetenango
 OpenStreetMap - Huehuetenango
 FallingRain - Huehuetenango Airport

Airports in Guatemala
Huehuetenango Department